The Portgate was a fortified gateway, constructed as part of  Hadrian's Wall where it crossed the Roman road now known as Dere Street, which preceded Hadrian's Wall by around 50 years.  It was built to control traffic along Dere Street as it passed north through Hadrian's Wall. The gate's remains exist beneath the old B6318 Military Road to the south-west of the Stagshaw Roundabout (the B6318 was diverted slightly for the construction of the Stagshaw Roundabout, leaving two short sections of the existing road unlinked – the remains of the Portgate are buried beneath the western section).

Origins of the name 
If any name was given to the structure by the Romans, it is no longer known.  The name Portgate is thought to be of Anglo-Saxon origin.

Construction 
The Portgate was constructed from very large masonry blocks. It was probably a square or rectangular structure.

Excavations and investigations
1732 - John Horsley reported visible remains of a fortification at the location, stating

1955 - English Heritage Field Investigation.  It was noted that to the east of Dere Street there is a suggestion that the ditch turned north and followed the road for a short distance, however it is probable that this effect is due to contemporary drainage ditches.
1966 - Excavation directed by Miss D. Charlesworth exposed the west tower of the Portgate in the verge a few inches North of the kerb of the B6318.

Civil parish 
Portgate was a civil parish, in 1951 the parish had a population of 52. Portgate was formerly a township in St. John-Lee parish, from 1866 Portgate was a civil parish in its own right until it was abolished on 1 April 1955 and merged with Corbridge.

Monument records

References

Bibliography

Hadrian's Wall
Former civil parishes in Northumberland
Corbridge